Jacquy Haddouche (February 19, 1964 – October 23, 2010) was a French serial killer. He was convicted of three murders committed between 1992 and 2002, and was sentenced to life imprisonment with a 22-year lock-in period.

Biography 
Haddouche was born to Algerian parents. His mother was Djouber Azzouz, and his father was Ahmed Haddouche, who was a soldier in the French army during the Algerian war, and in 1962, like many harkis, Ahmed Haddouche was evacuated with his family to France. In Beauvais, Oise, he found a job as a specialized worker at the Lockheed factory, where, after becoming alcoholic and very violent, was dismissed from his job. Jacquy Haddouche was born on February 19, 1964, in a family where he was the third of twelve children. He was educated at George Sand College, and was considered intelligent and sensitive, but also unstable, aggressive, impulsive, intolerant, manipulative and unable to take frustration.

In 1979, the juvenile judge placed him in a guarded education center in Méru, where he escaped regularly to join the family housing. It is there that at sixteen, he lived through a traumatic scene. Unable to support his wife's divorce proceedings, Ahmed Haddouche committed suicide by shooting himself in the head in front of his son Jacquy. He was splashed by his father's blood and his father's body fell on him. Traumatized, he then left school, sunk into delinquency and became a substance abuser.

Condemned and incarcerated several times, Jacquy Haddouche married in 1988, in Liancourt, at the instigation of his mother, which allowed him to obtain a reduction of his sentence. His ex-wife regretted the eight months that their marriage lasted.

Early crimes 
In 1981, he committed a gang rape with a legionnaire older than him. He was sentenced to five years in prison by the cour d'assises for minors.

In 1986, he was sentenced to eight years in prison for a violent robbery.

In 1993, he was sentenced to six months in prison for burglary.

In 1996, he was sentenced to three months, four months and six months in prison for theft, aggravated theft and counterfeiting.

In 1997, he was sentenced to two years in prison for fraud and aggravated theft.

In 1998, he was sentenced to six years in prison for robbery, his victim surviving poisoning with drugs.

Facts and investigation 
On November 30, 1992, in the early evening, in Beauvais, Haddouche met 45-year-old Gilles Canette, a divorced and depressed French teacher, in an elevator. They talked for a bit, and Canette invited Haddouche to his apartment. Around 7:00pm, two boys, pupils of Canette, came to talk to him. The teenagers noticed that Haddouche behaved oddly, seemingly inspecting the rooms of the apartment. They left around 8:00pm. Haddouche spent the evening with Canette, eventually poisoning him with an antidepressant, cyamemazine, and then asphyxiating him. At midnight, the credit card of Gilles Canette was used at a vending machine, which was odd, considering that when Canette wanted money from his account, he would always withdraw it at the bank counter, and he never used his card to the distributor. Early in the morning of December 1, 1992, Haddouche went to see the two teenagers at their home and threatened them to deny seeing him at Canette's place the night before. On December 1, 1992, Canette was discovered naked on his bed by his cleaning lady. Police found a fingerprint of Haddouche on a bottle of strawberry syrup, and he was suspected of the murder. Haddouche admitted to having gone to Canette's house, but not on the date of the murder. On December 13, 1993, Haddouche was taken into custody, but denied the accusations and declared that he was in the Paris region with his companion: Cloé. Cloé arrived conveniently at the police station and confirmed the alibi. When the police asked her for clarification, she refused to answer questions and left the police station. In his cell in custody, Haddouche made a suicide attempt by injuring his veins with a lighter and was hospitalized. The period of custody being over and the police not having enough evidence to convict Haddouche, the court abandoned the prosecution against him and closed the case.

At the end of May 1995, at the Charlie Brown bar on Guy Patin street in Beauvais, Francine C., a pedagogical director in a medical-educational institute, was with a group of friends. Haddouche joined the group and befriended them. At the beginning of June 1995, Haddouche went to Francine's residence on Nicolas Pastour Street, but she refused to let him in. He knocked on the front door so hard that she finally decided to open it and let him in. He told her that he was exhausted because he had just finished a guard at Méru's hospital. Compassionate, she offered him some coffee which he asked for. When he finished, she told him to leave, but Haddouche refused, and told him that Cloé, his now former companion, was with Frederick, a former friend. He took her to the room, raped her and left. She threw the sheets and washed with bleach the places where Haddouche was at her place. During the following weeks, Haddouche harassed her on the phone and kept watch in front of her door. She did not dare to complain and sunk into depression.

In June 2002 in Beauvais, Haddouche reconnected with Isabelle, whom he had originally met in 1991 and pretended he was a doctor. They then began a brief relationship. One evening, a drunk Haddouche struck Isabelle in the face in the presence of her daughter. He called her the next day and asked her to bring him some heart medicine, claiming that he was dying. When Isabelle arrived, he raped her.

On June 20, 2002, around 7:00pm, Haddouche entered the SONACOTRA home on d'Anjou Street in the Argentinian district of Beauvais. Around 8:00pm, he forced open the door to the studio of Léo Capon, a 73-year-old retiree. Haddouche attacked and slaughtered Capon, searching the apartment and stealing objects of little value. Nervous, Capon's daughter, Daniele, went to her mother's house. She was surprised that the front door was unlocked. When she entered, everything had been searched and all the objects were upside down. There were many traces of blood on the floor, and garbage bags filled with various objects near the front door. Capon was lying on her back, in the bathroom, her face covered with pieces of cardboard. On the video surveillance strips of the building, a balding man carrying bags full of items in each hand and a cap hiding his face was visible. Because of the poor quality images, he could not be identified. Male DNA was discovered on various objects at Capon's house, but it was not listed in FNAEG. Capon was disfigured by the blows she had received, and forensic scientists established that she had died by choking on her own blood.

On July 4, 2002, in Boulogne-sur-Mer, Haddouche entered the apartment of Liliane D., the owner of a bar. He hit and tried to rape her, but was unsuccessful.

On July 15, 2002, at the bar  L'endroit in Saint-Étienne, Sylvain Rome, a 32-year-old cameraman, sympathized with Haddouche at the counter. Around 4:00pm, they left the bar together, Rome later buying drinks at the superette next to his home. Around 5:00pm, David Sabido, a friend of Rome, came to his apartment, but Rome made him understand that he was bothering him and refused to let Sabido in. Haddouche later poisoned Rome with Bromazepam and stabbed him. He cleaned the apartment, stole a checkbook, the mobile phone, Rome's identity papers and the keys to the apartment. On July 27, 2002, Sylvain Rome's father discovered him lying on his stomach on his bed.

The investigators established that Rome had a high blood alcohol level, was not depressed and did not consume antidepressants. A facial composite was made thanks to the descriptions of the bartender and Lucien Florent, a customer of the bar, with whom Haddouche spoke with a little before meeting Rome.

At the end of August 2002, Haddouche seduced Nathalie, a young beneficiary of the RMI, to whom he introduced himself as a doctor at the hospital center of Beauvais. One week later, while they were drinking, Haddouche drugged her second glass of kir without Nathalie's knowledge. She became sick and was hospitalized. He stole her bank card and all of Nathalie's RMI.

In September 2002, Haddouche tried to make contact with Francine, who had decided to file a complaint against him for the 1995 rape.

On September 13, 2002, in the Argentinean district of Beauvais, Liliane Michaud, 82, who requires a walker to get around, was returning from the supermarket Intermarché. After arriving at her pavilion, Haddouche attacked her, savagely beating her and stealing her wallet. When the investigators described the abuser to the supermarket security agents, they positively identified Jacquy Haddouche.

On September 30, 2002, the police filed a convocation against Haddouche, who did not attend.

Arrest 
On October 2, 2002, a little after 11:00pm, in Gard, Haddouche tried to break into a station by breaking a window. A security guard noticed him and alerted police officers on patrol. They later spotted the drunk Haddouche, who resisted their arrest. He claimed to be a kinesiotherapist and that his name was Saïd Haddouche. By checking his fingerprints in the automated fingerprint file, the police discovered that his first name was Jacquy, not Saïd. After running his name through the wanted persons file, the police discovered he was wanted for murder in Beauvais.

Later, Liliane Michaud formally recognized Jacquy Haddouche.

On December 3, 2002, Haddouche was indicted for the murder of Léo Capon, but he denied it. Objects stolen from her home were found by the police when they searched his home. Haddouche then accused his roommate of being the murderer.

In 2003, Cloé confessed to the investigating judge that she had lied, because in December 1992, she did not know Haddouche yet. She only met him while she was studying in Beauvais.

The telephone records showed that Haddouche's mobile phone was detected by the cell site that covered the area where Sylvain Rome's apartment was on the date of the murder. In custody in St. Etienne, Haddouche recognized that it was mid July 2002 came to visit members of his family. In 2003, during the police lineup behind a beam splitter, Lucien Florent formally identified Haddouche. He finally admitted that he met Sylvain at the bar, but said that he had never been to his house.

Haddouche admitted to having met Francine C. at the bar Charlie Brown, but denied having gone to her home. He declared that the complaint for rape against him was a revenge on the part of the victim, because he did not give her the narcotics which she had ordered from him for an amount of 30,000 francs.

List of known victims

Trial and conviction 
Jacquy Haddouche was sentenced by the tribunal correctionnel to 8 years in prison, for the attack on Liliane Michaud.

The defense of Jacquy Haddouche was provided by lawyers Karim Beylouni and Julien Vernet.

In 2007, the trial of Jacquy Haddouche began at the cour d'assises of the Loire in Saint-Etienne.

André Buffard was the lawyer of the family of Sylvain Rome.

In March 2007, Jacquy Haddouche was sentenced to 30 years in prison, with a 20-year lock-in period for the murder of Sylvain Rome. He tried to appeal this decision, but on the first day of the new trial, Haddouche gave it up.

On April 23, 2008, the trial of Jacquy Haddouche began at the cour d'assises of Oise in Beauvais.

Antoine Vaast was the lawyer of Gilles Canette's family, Philippe Tabart was the lawyer for Léo Capon's family and Virginie Bella-Gamba was the lawyer of Francine C.

On May 7, 2008, Haddouche was sentenced to life imprisonment with a 22-year lock-up period, with 20 years of mandatory care and treatment, for the murders of Gilles Canette and Léo Capon and the 1995 rape. He tried to appeal this decision.

On March 9, 2009, Haddouche's appeal trial began at the cour d'assises of the Somme in Amiens.

Haddouche admitted to the murder of Léo Capon and the attempted rape in Boulogne-sur-Mer, but continued to deny the murder of Gilles Canette and the rape of 1995.

He was again sentenced to life imprisonment with a 22-year lock-in period.

Jacquy Haddouche appealed in cassation, but the appeal was dismissed.

Death 
On October 23, 2010, Jacquy Haddouche died from a cerebral hemorrhage in the Fresnes prison in the Val-de-Marne.

TV documentary 

 "Jacquy Haddouche, At the chance of crime" May 2, 2010 in Get the accused presented by Christophe Hondelatte on France 2.

Radio show 

 "Jacquy Haddouche" March 21, 2018 in Hondelatte tells presented by Christophe Hondelatte on Europe 1.

See also 
 List of serial killers by country

References

External links 

 Biography of Jacquy Haddouche on a site devoted to serial killers.

1964 births
2010 deaths
French people convicted of murder
French people convicted of rape
French rapists
French serial killers
Male serial killers
Murder in France
People from Beauvais
Serial killers who died in prison custody